Pre-1927 Route 15 was a route in New Jersey that ran from Bridgeton east to Rio Grande, existing between 1917 and 1927. Today, it is part of the following routes:
 New Jersey Route 49
 New Jersey Route 47

15 (pre-1927)